Aaragah is a wadi (river) of Yemen. It flows through the Abyan Governorate.  It flows through the town of Al Qaws.

References

Rivers of Yemen
Abyan Governorate